Hugh Thomas Baker (19 July 1906 in County Cork, Ireland – 1989 in Harare, Zimbabwe) was an Irish cricketer. He was a right-handed batsman who played one first-class game for Dublin University against Northamptonshire in 1926, scoring two runs in a match that also featured the Irish playwright Samuel Beckett on his team.

External links 
 Cricket Archive profile
 Scorecard of only match
Cricinfo profile

1906 births
1989 deaths
Dublin University cricketers
Irish cricketers
Cricketers from County Cork